Torres is a municipality in the province of Jaén, Spain. According to the 2015 census, the municipality has a population of 1,516 inhabitants.

Economy
The economy of Torres is based on the agriculture, basically production of olive oil and cherries. It is also important the rural tourism, with some hotels in the area, the construction sector, and the repairing of agriculture machinery.

In the year 2012, more than 570,000 kg of cherries were collected in its municipality.

Gallery

See also
Sierra Mágina

References

External links 

Excelentísimo Ayuntamiento de Torres

 auto

Municipalities in the Province of Jaén (Spain)